Clóvis Raposo (30 May 1909 – 3 May 1963) was a Brazilian athlete. He competed in the men's long jump at the 1932 Summer Olympics in Los Angeles, finishing in eighth place.

References

1909 births
1963 deaths
Athletes (track and field) at the 1932 Summer Olympics
Brazilian male long jumpers
Olympic athletes of Brazil
Place of birth missing